Diabene   is a town in the Western region of Ghana. It is 15 kilometres from the centre  Takoradi the Western regional capital. The serves as a dormitory town for workers who work in and around the Takoradi metropolis.

Boundaries
The town is bordered on Mpintsin on the East, Fijai on the North and Sekondi on the south.

Notable place
The town has a secondary technical school - The Diabene Secondary Technical School. It is a unisex secondary institution that offers course mostly in Metal work, wood work etc.

References

Populated places in the Western Region (Ghana)